Khiyam al-Walid was a Palestinian Arab village in the Safad Subdistrict located  northeast of Safad along the Syrian border. In 1945, there were 280 predominantly Muslim inhabitants. It was depopulated during the 1948 Palestine War.

History
The name of the village in Arabic is translated as "the tents of al-Walid", which may refer to the Arab Muslim commander Khalid ibn al-Walid (d. 642). According to local tradition, a shrine and the tomb of the sage Shaykh ibn al-Walid was located in the village mosque.

British Mandate era
In the 1931 census of Palestine the population of Khiyam al-Walid was 181, all Muslims, in a total of 42 houses.

Khiyam al Walid was classified as a hamlet by the Palestine Index Gazeteer. During the British Mandate period, many of the houses were situated along the road to the nearby village of az-Zawiya. There was a good water source to the east, and the village consequently expanded in that direction. In a 1945 survey, the village was made up of a total 4,215 dunams. Despite its entire population being Arab, 92% of its land was Jewish-owned.

Types of land use in dunams in the village in the 1945 statistics:

The land ownership of the village before occupation in dunams:

1948, aftermath
According to an Israeli military report in June 1948, the residents fled on May 1 in anticipation of an attack by Israeli forces. It was occupied by the end of may in Operation Yiftach.

Palestinian historian Walid Khalidi wrote of the remains of the village in 1992, saying "The site is deserted and overgrown with grass and thorns. There are a few carob trees, piles of stones, and crumbled terraces."

References

Bibliography

External links
Welcome To Khiyam al-Walid
Khiyam al-Walid, Zochrot
Khiayam al-Walid at Khalil Sakakini Cultural Center

Arab villages depopulated during the 1948 Arab–Israeli War
District of Safad